Minairo "Michael" Frederick (born 17 May 2000) is an Australian rules footballer who plays for the Fremantle Football Club in the Australian Football League (AFL).

Early life

He was named Minairo at birth, but prefers to be known by his baptised name, Michael. His twin brother Manguru (Martin) plays for Port Adelaide. He completed school at Christian Brothers College, Adelaide in 2018.
He was drafted with the 61st selection in the 2019 AFL draft from Woodville-West Torrens in the South Australian National Football League (SANFL), where he had won the Alan Stewart Medal as the best player in the 2019 SANFL Under 18 Grand Final.

Professional career
Frederick made his AFL debut for Fremantle during round seven of the 2020 AFL season in the Western Derby at Optus Stadium kicking a goal on debut. Frederick finished his debut year playing 10 games and kicking four goals. Frederick had a stand out performance during round 11 of the 2022 AFL season, he kicked two goals and finished with a game-high 11 score involvements, 17 disposals and four marks during Fremantle's 38 point win over Melbourne at the MCG. Frederick again had a great performance the following week during Fremantle's top 4 clash against Brisbane, kicking 3 goals and amassing 18 disposals, 7 score involvements and 10 marks in the 14 point win. Later that month Frederick was handed a one-match ban by Fremantle after consuming alcohol during a six-day break and as a result missed Fremantle's round 13 game against Hawthorn.

Statistics
 Statistics are correct to the end of round 10, 2022

|- style="background-color: #EAEAEA"
! scope="row" style="text-align:center" | 2020
|
| 43 || 10 || 4 || 6 || 41 || 39 || 80 || 18 || 8 || 0.4 || 0.6 || 4.1 || 3.9 || 8.0 || 1.8 || 0.8
|-
! scope="row" style="text-align:center" | 2021
|
| 43 || 7 || 5 || 11 || 52 || 16 || 68 || 35 || 7 || 0.7 || 1.6 || 7.4 || 2.3 || 9.7 || 5.0 || 1.0
|- style="background-color: #EAEAEA"
! scope="row" style="text-align:center" | 2022
|
| 32 || 9 || 10 || 4 || 54 || 34 || 88 || 27 || 19 || 1.1 || 0.4 || 6.0 || 3.8 || 9.8 || 3.0 || 2.1
|- class="sortbottom"
! colspan=3| Career
! 26
! 19
! 21
! 147
! 89
! 236
! 80
! 34
! 0.7
! 0.8
! 5.7
! 3.4
! 9.1
! 3.1
! 1.3
|}

Notes

References

External links

2000 births
Australian people of South Sudanese descent
Sportspeople of South Sudanese descent
Living people
Fremantle Football Club players
Australian rules footballers from Adelaide
Australian twins
Twin sportspeople
Woodville-West Torrens Football Club players
South Sudanese players of Australian rules football